The Federal Aviation Act of 1958 was an act of the United States Congress, signed by President Dwight D. Eisenhower, that created the Federal Aviation Agency (later the Federal Aviation Administration or the FAA) and abolished its predecessor, the Civil Aeronautics Administration (CAA). The act empowered the FAA to oversee and regulate safety in the airline industry and the use of American airspace by both military aircraft and civilian aircraft.

Background
Aviation in the United States was unregulated until the Air Commerce Act became law in 1926. The Act created an Aeronautic Branch within the United States Department of Commerce with regulatory powers over civil aviation. Among the functions the Aeronautic Branch performed were pilot testing and licensing, issuing aircraft airworthiness certificates, establishing and enforcing safety regulations. The agency was also responsible for establishing airways and operating and maintaining aids to air navigation, in addition to investigating accidents and incidents.

In 1934, the Aeronautics Branch was renamed the Bureau of Air Commerce. In 1936 the Bureau took over air traffic control centers previously operated by commercial airlines, and began to expand the air traffic control system.

In 1938, the Civil Aeronautics Act moved oversight of non-military aviation into a new, independent agency, the Civil Aeronautics Authority. The new agency gained the authority the power to regulate fares and routes for commercial airlines. Another change followed in 1940, with CAA's authority being split. The CAA continued to have authority for air traffic control, safety, and  promotion of civil aviation. The new Civil Aeronautics Board (CAB) was established and had responsibility for accident investigation, as well as regulation of safety of civil aviation and pricing of commercial aviation.

A boom in the 1950s of aircraft technology and the airline industry crowded American airspace, and the regulation of air traffic was considered antiquated.

In 1956, President Dwight D. Eisenhower appointed Edward Peck Curtis as Special Assistant for Aviation. Later that year, Curtis was named by Eisenhower to head a commission to study the dramatic increase in airline traffic and to propose ways to deal with airplane traffic jams at airports.

From that commission came a proposal to create a new Federal aviation agency that would replace the Civil Aeronautics Administration and the Civil Aeronautics Board to consolidate air operations, modernize the airways and to make and enforce safety rules.

An ensuing series of plane accidents prompted the creation of the Federal Aviation Agency, later to be known as the Federal Aviation Administration.

Mid-air collisions spur change

On the morning of June 30, 1956, United Flight 718 collided with TWA Flight 2 over the Grand Canyon, resulting in 128 deaths, which was at the time the largest loss of life in an aviation accident. This high-profile accident, which took place in uncontrolled airspace, raised public concern for airline safety. In 1957 Congress passed the Airways Modernization Act that established the Airways Modernization Board (AMB) headed by General Elwood Quesada.

Two subsequent mid-air collisions between military aircraft and commercial airliners, one near Las Vegas, Nevada (United Airlines Flight 736) on April 21, 1958, where 49 died, and one involving Capital Airlines (Capital Airlines Flight 300) over Brunswick, Maryland a month later on May 20 that cost 11 lives, showed further imperfections in the regulation of air traffic, particularly the need for unified control of airspace for civil and military flights. The day after the Brunswick collision, Senator Mike Monroney and Representative Oren Harris introduced the Federal Aviation Act. Two days after the Capital Airlines mid-air, a stopgap presidential proclamation was issued that 1) required military jet aircraft to fly by Instrument Flight Rules while in the civil airways below 25,000 ft. (later reduced to 20,000 ft.); 2) prohibited jet penetration swoops from high to low altitudes through civil airways. An exception was made for emergency jet-bomber and fighter "scrambles," which would be continued whenever necessary for the national defense.

Citing "recent midair collisions of aircraft occasioning tragic losses of human life," President Eisenhower announced the White House's support of the legislation on June 13. The legislation passed Congress and was signed into law by Eisenhower on August 23, 1958. Eisenhower appointed AMB Chairman Quesada the first FAA Administrator.

A Memorandum of Agreement (MOA) between the DoD and FAA on the Future of Radar Approach Controls in the National Airspace System, 14 December 1988, states that the FAA "determines the standard for NAS equipment and ATC facilities" and that the "DoD will equip facilities providing services to civil users so that the ATC service is transparent to the user."

Codification and repeal
In 1994, Congress approved  which recodified existing aviation legislation and the 1958 Aviation Act was repealed.

See also
 Federal Aviation Regulations
 United States government role in civil aviation

References

Further reading
 babel.hathitrust.org

1958 in aviation
1958 in American law
85th United States Congress
United States federal transportation legislation
Aviation law